Peter Hayes Sawyer (25 June 1928 – 7 July 2018) was a British historian. His work on the Vikings was highly influential, as was his scholarship on Medieval England.  Sawyer's early work The Age of the Vikings argued that the Vikings were "traders not raiders", overturning the previously held view that the Vikings' voyages were only focused on destruction and pillaging.

Sawyer is particularly known for his annotated catalogue of Anglo-Saxon charters.  Anglo-Saxon charters are referenced by "Sawyer" numbers (abbreviated 'S' as for example in charter "S 407") according to his catalogue.

Biography
Sawyer was born in Oxford, England, on 25 June 1928, the son of Grace Woodbridge and Bill Sawyer, a tobacconist. He grew up in Oxford, except for time spent with relatives in Milford Haven during WWII.

Sawyer studied at Oxford University from 1948 to 1951, where he was a member of Jesus College and graduated with a B.A. Honours in Modern History.  He then was a research student at the University of Manchester from 1951 to 1953. After his time in Manchester, Sawyer was an assistant at the University of Edinburgh from 1953 to 1956 and a lecturer in medieval history at the University of Birmingham from 1957 to 1964. He taught at the University of Leeds from 1964, becoming professor of Medieval History in 1970. There, in collaboration with Robert Stuart Hoyt, he founded the International Medieval Bibliography. He retired early from Leeds in 1982 and was subsequently (in 1998) given the title emeritus professor.  Sawyer continued his teaching and research at Göteborg University as a docent, and had various stints as a visiting professor in the United States: at the University of Minnesota from 1966 to 1967 and then again in 1984, and at the University of California, Berkeley in 1985. Between 1996 and 2006 he worked in Trondheim (where his wife Birgit was a professor of Medieval History), connected to NTNU, and from 2006 he lived and worked in Uppsala.

He died in Uppsala, aged 90, in July 2018.

Works

References

External links
 Ian N. Wood, 'Peter Hayes Sawyer (25 June 1928 – 7 July 2018)', Leeds Medieval Studies, 1 (2021), 101–4, 
 Peter Hayes Sawyer: Curriculum Vitae
 Charters by Sawyer number
 Svearikets vagga – The cradle of Sweden – a Swedish program where Sawyer appears
 Leeds University promotional video, c. 1983 featuring Sawyer at 10.11.
 The Electronic Sawyer

1928 births
2018 deaths
People from Oxford
Anglo-Saxon studies scholars
British historians
British medievalists
Alumni of the University of Oxford
Academics of the University of Leeds
English expatriates in Norway
English expatriates in Sweden
British emigrants to Sweden
British male non-fiction writers
20th-century British non-fiction writers
20th-century British male writers
21st-century British non-fiction writers